Ruse Municipality is a municipality (obshtina) in Ruse Province, Central-North Bulgaria, located along the right bank of Danube river in the Danubian Plain. It is named after its administrative centre - the city of Ruse which is also a capital of the province.

Apart from the cultural heritage of the main city, the area is best known with the Danube Bridge, the first bridge over the Danube in Bulgaria.

The main roads E85, E70 and II-21 crosses the municipality, connecting the province centre of Ruse with the cities of Veliko Tarnovo, Pleven, Razgrad and Silistra.

Settlements 

Ruse Municipality includes the following 14 places (towns are shown in bold):

Demography 
The following table shows the change of the population during the last four decades. Since 1992 Ruse Municipality has comprised the former municipality of Novo Selo and the numbers in the table reflect this unification.

Religion 
According to the latest Bulgarian census of 2011, the religious composition, among those who answered the optional question on religious identification, was the following:

See also
Provinces of Bulgaria
Municipalities of Bulgaria
List of cities and towns in Bulgaria

References

External links
 Official website 

Municipalities in Ruse Province